The Bangkok–Nong Khai high-speed railway or Northeastern high-speed rail line is a high-speed railway under construction in Thailand. It will be the first high-speed line in Thailand. It will be constructed in multiple phases; the first phase, between Bangkok and Nakhon Ratchasima, is expected to open in 2026 after multiple delays. The rest of the line is expected to be operational by 2028.

The railway is envisioned to serve as a major connection along the Kunming–Singapore railway central line.

History
High-speed rail in Thailand was first planned by the Thai parliament in 2010 with a proposal of five routes radiating from Bangkok.

In March 2013, then transport minister revealed that only one company would be selected to run all high-speed train routes, scheduled to be operational between 2018 and 2019. The first 86 km section from Krung Thep Aphiwat Central Terminal to Ayutthaya was planned to be tendered in late-2013; however following the 2014 Thai coup d'état, plans were deferred.

In November 2014, Thailand and China signed a memorandum of understanding agreeing to construct the Thai portion of the transnational railway running from Kunming, China, to the Gulf of Thailand. In November 2015, both parties agreed to a division of labour. Under the framework, a joint venture will be set up to run the project. China will conduct feasibility studies, design the system, construct tunnels and bridges, and lay track. Thailand will conduct social and environmental impact studies, expropriate land for construction, handle general civil engineering and power supply, and supply construction materials.

China will operate and maintain the system for the first three years of operation. Both countries will share responsibility from the third to seventh years. Afterwards, Thailand will have sole responsibility, and China will advise. China will provide training for operations and maintenance.

Dual standard-gauge tracks will be laid in the project. In Thailand, two routes will diverge at a junction in Kaeng Khoi District in Saraburi Province. One will connect Bangkok to Kaeng Khoi. The other route will connect Kaeng Khoi with Map Ta Phut Industrial Estate of Rayong Province. From Kaeng Khoi tracks will lead north to Nakhon Ratchasima and on to Nong Khai Province. The Bangkok to Nong Khai HSR line will connect to the  Boten–Vientiane railway from Vientiane to the northern Lao border and the  line from the Lao border to Kunming.
In 2017, the spur line between Kaeng Khoi and Map Ta Phut has been scrapped due to the reason that two countries are unable to reach a loan agreement.

In July 2021, authorities said that "works which will have to be postponed are the [... tracks] between Nawa Nakhon and Ban Pho, between Phra Kaeo and Saraburi"; furthermore another postponement, "presumably until [... 2022 is] the section between Don Mueang and Nawa Nakhon".

As for December 2022, 16% of Bangkok to Nakhon Ratchasima section has been completed which is behind the schedule of 36%.

Among the 14 contracts, 1 has been completed, 10 contracts are under construction, 3 contracts have not been started.

Rolling stock
Northeastern High Speed Railway will use Fuxing Hao CR300AF High-speed rail EMU, produced by CRRC. The CR300AF models has a maximum speed of 300 km/h (Operating speed in Thailand will be 250 km/h).

Construction

Construction divided into four sections: Bangkok–Kaeng Khoi, Map Ta Phut–Kaeng Khoi, Kaeng Khoi-Nakhon Ratchasima, Nakhon Ratchasima–Nong Khai. Construction of Thailand's  portion of the railway system started in December 2017 and is expected to take three years for phase 1 to Nakhon Ratchasima. The first contract consisted of a 3.5 km section from Klong Dan to Pang Asok with a budget of 371 million baht after a nine percent decrease from the initial budget.

In February 2018, the Thai transport minister stated that the contract for the first phase, the 250.8 km Bangkok to Nakhon Ratchasima section, would be issued by May 2018. The second contract will cover the 11 km section from Sikhio to Kut Chik. The first phase of the line to Nakhon Ratchasima has been divided into 14 contracts, with contracts 3–7 to be auctioned by June 2018, while contracts 8-14 would be auctioned before the end of 2018. Later, however, there were disputes between China, Thailand and Laos over the financing of the project. Thailand decided to finance its part of the route itself, although only the high-speed route Bangkok – Nakhon Ratchasima is to be built for the time being. After several postponements, the Bangkok (Krung Thep Aphiwat Central Terminal) to Nakhon Ratchasima high-speed rail project (Phase 1) was officially launched by the Thai government in October 2020. However, the Nakhon Ratchasima to Nong Khai section (Phase 2) and the Nong Khai to Vientiane section (Phase 3) has not yet been confirmed.

Construction contracts and progress

Route 

Phase 1: Bangkok (Krung Thep Aphiwat) – Don Mueang – Ayutthaya – Saraburi – Pak Chong – Nakhon Ratchasima

Phase 2: Nakhon Ratchasima – Bua Yai – Ban Phai – Khon Kaen – Udon Thani – Nong Khai

Phase 3: Nong Khai – Vientiane (including a new Mekong bridge which is 50 meters from the current one)

References

Rail transport in Thailand
High-speed rail in Thailand
High-speed railway lines under construction
Belt and Road Initiative